Ortsevo is a  remote  village in the municipality of Belitsa, in Blagoevgrad Province, Bulgaria. It is located approximately 23 kilometers east of Belitsa and 87 kilometers southeast of Sofia. As of 2010 it had a population of 213 people. The population is Muslim of Bulgarian origin.

References

Villages in Blagoevgrad Province